Margaret Melinda Williams-Purce (born September 18, 1995) is an American soccer player who plays as a forward for NJ/NY Gotham FC in the National Women's Soccer League (NWSL). She previously played for Portland Thorns FC and the Boston Breakers. She played college soccer at Harvard University.

In 2020, she was elected to a seat on the Board of Overseers of Harvard University with the support of Harvard Forward, an alumni climate activism group.

Early life
Margaret Purce, nicknamed Midge, is the daughter of James Purce, and has an older brother, JP Purce. She began playing soccer as a child, following in the footsteps of her brother. She attended Our Lady of Good Counsel Catholic High School in Olney, Maryland, near her hometown of Silver Spring, Maryland where she was named Maryland Gatorade Player of the Year in 2012 and an NSCAA All-American in 2010 and 2011.

College career

Harvard Crimson, 2013–2016
Purce scored 42 goals in 69 appearances with the Harvard University women's soccer team, and was named Ivy League Player of the Year twice, in 2015 and 2016, and a first-team NSCAA All-American in 2016. She majored in psychology at Harvard in pursuit of a future law career.

Club career

Boston Breakers, 2017
After playing for Harvard, Purce was drafted by the Boston Breakers with the 9th pick in the 2017 NWSL College Draft. She appeared in 22 games for Boston and scored one goal.

Portland Thorns FC, 2018–2019
After the Breakers folded in January 2018, the league held a dispersal draft for the Breakers' players; Purce was selected with the 4th pick by the Portland Thorns.

Purce made 21 appearances and 16 starts for the Thorns in 2018, playing primarily as a right fullback. During the 2019 NWSL season, Purce moved into wide and central forward positions, and at one point scored 5 goals in a span of 5 games.

NJ/NY Gotham FC, 2020–present
Purce was traded to Sky Blue FC in 2020. During the 2021 NWSL season Purce played as a forward and scored nine goals, leading the team. She came in second in the NWSL Golden Boot race and was named to the NWSL Best XI in the 2021 NWSL Awards alongside teammates Caprice Dydasco and Kailen Sheridan. Purce was also a finalist for 2021 NWSL MVP following a breakout season.

In January 2022, Purce signed a two year contract extension with NJ/NY Gotham FC. Gotham FC head coach Scott Parkinson describes Purce as an "intelligent footballer that can defend from the front for 90 minutes and is a constant threat when we have the ball."

International career

Youth USWNT (2011–2018)
Purce was called up to the United States women's national U17, U20, and U23 teams. She played in the 2012 FIFA U-17 Women's World Cup, made 4 appearances and 3 starts in the 2014 FIFA U-20 Women's World Cup, and scored goals for the US U20s against France in a friendly and against Mexico in the 2014 CONCACAF U20 Championship.

Senior USWNT (2017–)
Purce received her first call-up to the United States women's national team for the 2017 Tournament of Nations but she did not appear in any of the three games. She received another call-up in June 2018 for a pair of friendlies against China PR, but she sustained an ankle injury in training camp and was ruled out for the two friendlies.

In November 2019, in Vlatko Andonovski's first training camp as the new USWNT head coach, Purce received another call-up. Despite playing primarily as a forward throughout her career, Purce was brought in to camp to experiment as a defender. Purce played in her first match for the United States women's national team in their friendly against Costa Rica on November 10, 2019. She played the full 90 minutes of the game as right back, and had a cross deflected in for a Costa Rica own goal in the U.S. team's 6–0 victory. Purce scored her first senior national team against Colombia on January 21, 2021.

In November 2021, Purce was called up to her first senior national team camp as a forward.

Personal life 
Purce is currently serving a six-year term as a member of the Board of Overseers at Harvard University. Purce co-founded and currently serves as a board member for the Black Women's Players Collective, a nonprofit with the goal of advancing opportunities for black girls in sport and beyond.

On March 24, 2021, Purce made an appearance at the White House with USWNT teammate Megan Rapinoe to raise awareness of the importance of equal pay. In her remarks to introduce First Lady Jill Biden, Purce said, "You would never expect a flower to bloom without water," Purce said. "But women in sport who have been denied water, sunlight and soil are somehow expected to blossom. Invest in women, then let's talk again when you see the return."

Career statistics

International

Player statistics

International goals

Honors and awards
United States

 CONCACAF Women's Championship: 2022

 SheBelieves Cup: 2021; 2022; 2023
Individual
NWSL Team of the Month: June 2019, August 2019
NWSL Player of the Week: 2019 week 19, 2021 week 1, 2021 week 21
NWSL Goal of the Week: 2019 week 8
NWSL Best XI First Team: 2021

References

Match reports

External links
 Harvard bio
 NWSL player profile
 Portland Thorns FC player profile
 Gotham FC player profile

1995 births
Living people
African-American women's soccer players
American women's soccer players
Boston Breakers draft picks
Boston Breakers players
Harvard Crimson women's soccer players
National Women's Soccer League players
People from Olney, Maryland
Portland Thorns FC players
NJ/NY Gotham FC players
Soccer players from Maryland
Sportspeople from Montgomery County, Maryland
United States women's under-20 international soccer players
United States women's international soccer players
Women's association football forwards
Women's association football fullbacks
21st-century African-American sportspeople
21st-century African-American women